Balasubramaniam or Balasubramanian is a male given name in South India and Sri Lanka. Due to the South Indian tradition of using patronymic surnames it may also be a surname for males and females. Balasubramaniam is derived from the Sanskrit words balu meaning "young" and Subramaniam (itself derived from the Sanskrit words su, meaning "auspicious" and brahmanyam, translated loosely as "auspicious effulgence of the Supreme Spirit"). By extension, it refers to the Hindu god Murugan as a child or young man, the way the term Balakrishna refers to the young Krishna.

In Telugu, the name is written as Balasubrahmanyam or Balasubramanyam, closer to the Sanskrit root word. In Kannada, the name is transliterated as Balasubrahmanya or Balasubramanya.

Notable people

Given name
 Balasubramanian, Indian politician
 Balasubramaniem (born 1966), Indian cinematographer
 A. Balasubramaniam (born 1971), Indian artist
 D. Balasubramaniam, Indian actor
 G. N. Balasubramaniam (1910–1965), Indian musician
 K. Balasubramanian, Indian politician
 Krishnakumar Balasubramanian, Indian actor
 Kudavayil Balasubramanian, Indian archaeologist
 P Balasubramaniam (1960–2013), Malaysian police officer
 P. Balasubramanian, Indian politician
 R. Balasubramaniam, Indian actor
 Ramachandran Balasubramanian (born 1951), Indian mathematician
 S. Balasubramanian (born 1936), Indian journalist
 S. P. Balasubrahmanyam (1946–2020), Indian musician
 S. R. Balasubramaniam, Indian politician
 Shankar Balasubramanian (born 1966), British chemist
 Sirpi Balasubramaniam (born 1936), Indian poet and academic
 V. P. Balasubramanian, Indian politician

Surname
 Balasubramaniam Deniswaran, Sri Lankan lawyer and politician
 Balasubramanian Muthuraman, Indian businessman
 Balasubramaniam Neminathan (born 1922), Ceylonese politician
 Balasubramaniam Ramamurthi (1922–2003), Indian physician
 Balasubramanian Sundaram, Indian chemist
 Malar Balasubramanian (born 1976), American physician
 Rajeev Balasubramanyam (born 1974), British author

See also
 
 
 
 
 

Indian surnames
Indian given names
Tamil masculine given names
Telugu names
Telugu given names